Qadi Kola (also Romanized as Qādī Kolā) is a village in Nowkand Kola Rural District, in the Central District of Qaem Shahr County, Mazandaran Province, Iran. At the 2006 census, its population was 241, in 66 families.

References 

Populated places in Qaem Shahr County